51 Peg may refer to:
51 Pegasi, a star in the Pegasus constellation
51 Peg (band), an industrial rock band